The Oratorio de Noël, Op. 12, by Camille Saint-Saëns, also known as his Christmas Oratorio, is a cantata-like work scored for soloists, chorus, organ, strings and harp.  While an organist at La Madeleine, Saint-Saëns wrote the Christmas oratorio in less than a fortnight, completing it ten days before its premiere on Christmas 1858. The vocal score of this oratorio was prepared later by the composer and organist Eugene Gigout, a colleague of Saint-Saëns.

Performing forces 
The work is scored for five soloists (soprano, mezzo-soprano, alto, tenor, and baritone), SATB mixed chorus, organ, harp, and strings in the standard five sections. The women of the chorus divide into four parts in one movement. The organ plays a significant role in the work, often playing alone, while the harp is limited to three movements.

Text 
Saint-Saëns chose several verses from the Latin Vulgate Bible for the text of the work. "While these texts are not from a single source, it is clear that the traditional church liturgies surrounding Christmas influenced Saint-Saëns. About half of the texts he chose match different portions of two Christmas Offices: the First Mass at Midnight and the Second Mass at Dawn." One author calls the work "a musical enhancement of the words of the [Christmas] Office, without interest in the human drama."

The narrative portion of the text, taken from the second chapter of St. Luke, appears in the second movement and tells the part of the traditional Christmas story involving the shepherds. The remainder of the texts, taken from John, Isaiah, Lamentations, and the Psalms, reflect upon the meaning and significance of the event.

Structure and style 

The Oratorio de Noël is structured in a way that "hardly exceeds the limits of a cantata, but musically is constructed in oratorio style." However, "its shorter length and the fact that it was intended for presentation during a worship service place it closer in character and purpose to a traditional sacred cantata." Its structure bears a greater resemblance to oratorios of the early Baroque than to later works of that genre.

Saint-Saëns divided the work into 10 movements, a prelude followed by nine vocal numbers. After the prelude, opening recitatives and chorus, the work gradually builds from a single soloist accompanied by a small ensemble to involve the entire instrumental and vocal forces. The full chorus sings in the second, sixth, and final movements and the women of the chorus accompany the tenor soloist in the fourth.

While there are brief episodes of grandeur in the solo parts and one frenetic section for the chorus, most of the work is subdued and lyrical in character. Saint-Saëns's study of the choral music of Bach, Handel, Mozart, Berlioz, and others had a great influence on the work, with the most significant influences being Part II of J. S. Bach's Christmas Oratorio and Gounod's St. Cecilia Mass.

Movements 
 Prélude (dans le style de Seb. Bach), for organ and strings
 Recitative: “Et pastores erant”, for Soprano, Alto, Tenor and Baritone soloists, organ and strings; Chorus: "Gloria in altissimis," for mixed chorus, organ and strings
 Air: "Exspectans expectavi," for Mezzo-soprano soloist, organ and strings
 Air and chorus: “Domine, ego credidi,” for Tenor solo, women's chorus, organ and strings
 Duet: “Benedictus,” for Soprano and Baritone soloists, organ and harp
 Chorus: “Quare fremuerunt gentes,” mixed chorus, organ and strings
 Trio: “Tecum principium,” for Soprano, Tenor, and Baritone soloists, organ and harp
 Quartet: “Laudate coeli,” for Soprano, Mezzo-soprano, Alto, and Baritone soloists, organ and strings
 Quintet and chorus: “Consurge, filia Sion,” for all five soloists, chorus, organ, strings, and harp
 Chorus: “Tollite hostias,” for mixed chorus, organ and strings

Recordings

Literature 
 
Barrow, Lee G. (2014). Camille Saint-Saëns, Christmas Oratorio. BarGraphica. .

References

External links 
 
 

Christmas music
Oratorios
1858 compositions
Compositions by Camille Saint-Saëns